Nanabozho (in syllabics:), also known as Nanabush, is a spirit In Anishinaabe aadizookaan (traditional storytelling), particularly among the Ojibwe. Nanabozho figures prominently in their storytelling, including the story of the world's creation. Nanabozho is the Ojibwe trickster figure and culture hero (these two archetypes are often combined into a single figure in First Nations mythologies, among others).

Nanabozho can take the shape of male or female animals or humans in storytelling. Most commonly they are an animal such as a raven or coyote which lives near the tribe and which are cunning enough to make capture difficult.

Nanabozho  is a trickster figure in many First Nation storytellings. While the use of Nanabush through storytelling can be for entertainment, it is often used as a way to pass down information and general life lessons.

The Nanabozho spirit
As a trickster figure, it is often Nanabozho’s goal to create problems, which often highlight the struggles many Native people experience. According to Anishinaabe scholar, Leanne Simpson, for instance, Nanabush often experiments with capitalistic means. They can be greedy, manipulative, and money driven. Because of their worldly desires, chaos often ensues. However, as Nanabush develops deep relationships with those around them, they become more intune with themself and their surroundings. Furthermore, as Nanabozho becomes more receptive to their surroundings, Nanabozho is able to create the ideal of decolonization through learned consent, recognition, and reciprocity. Therefore, the stories of Nanabush are used to guide people through life experiences and teach moral lessons.

Shapeshifting 
Nanabozho is a shapeshifter who is both zoomorphic as well as anthropomorphic, meaning that Nanabozho can take the shape of animals or humans in storytelling. Thus Nanabush takes many different forms in storytelling, often changing depending on the tribe. The majority of storytelling depicts Nanabozho through a zoomorphic lens. In the Arctic and sub-Arctic, the trickster is usually called Raven. Coyote is present in the area of California, Oregon, the inland plateau, the Great Basin, and the Southwest and Southern Plains. Rabbit or Hare is the trickster figure in the Southeast, and Spider is in the northern plains. Meanwhile, Wolverine and Jay are the trickster in parts of Canada. Often, Nanabozho takes the shape of these animals because of their frequent presence among tribes. The animals listed above have similar behavioral patterns. For example, they all live near human settlements and are very cunning, enough so as to be captured with great difficulty.

Gender fluidity 
The gender identity of Nanabozho changes depending on the storytelling. Because Nanabozho is a shapeshifter, they are androgynous. While the majority of stories told about the trickster figure are written with he/him pronouns, the gender identity changes depending on the story and many are written with feminine pronouns. This allows Nanabozho a broader range of stories because they can adapt and change when needed.

Stories
Nanabozho is one of four sons from what some historical and religious scholars have interpreted as spirits of directions. He has a human mother, and E-bangishimog ("In the West"), a spirit father.

Nanabozho most often appears in the shape of a rabbit and is characterized as a trickster. In his rabbit form, he is called Mishaabooz ("Great rabbit" or "Hare") or Gitchii-waabooz ("Big rabbit"). He was sent to Earth by Gitche Manitou to teach the Ojibwe. One of his first tasks was to name all the plants and animals. Nanabozho is considered to be the founder of Midewiwin. He is the inventor of fishing and hieroglyphs. This historical figure is a shapeshifter and a co-creator of the world.

Fight with Paul Bunyan 
An Ojibwe legend describes Nanabozho's encounter with folklore lumberjack Paul Bunyan. Along Bunyan's path of deforestation, Nanabozho confronts Bunyan in Minnesota and implores him to leave the state without logging any more timber. A fight ensues and they battle for forty days and forty nights. Nanabozho ends the fight by slapping Bunyan across the face with a Red Lake walleye fish. After this, Bunyan "stumbles, [and] Nanabozho pulls at Paul’s whiskers, making him promise to leave the area." Unofficial sources add a portion in which Bunyan lands on his rear end at the end of the battle, creating Lake Bemidji with the shape of his buttocks.

This story claims to explain why Bunyan is beardless and facing west in the Lake Bemidji statue. A Nanabozho statue is situated across the street from the aforementioned Bunyan statue.

Similar characters in other Native cultures
Among the eastern Algonquian peoples located north of the Abenaki areas, a similar character to Nanabozho existed called Tcakabesh in the Algonquin language, Chikapash among the eastern James Bay Crees, Chaakaapaas by the Naskapi, Tshakapesh in the Innu language and Tcikapec in Atikamekw language, changing to various animal forms to various human forms (adult to child) and to various mythical animals such as the Great Porcupine, or Big Skunk. He conquered or diminished these mythical animals to smaller size after killing or changing them with his trickery or shapeshifting. Among the Meskwaki, Wīsakehā serves a similar role, as does Wisakedjak among northern Algonquian peoples and for the Saulteaux in the Great Plains. The Abenaki-influenced Algonquin had a similar figure called Kanòjigàbe (Fiero spelling: Ganoozhigaabe; Abenaki Gluskabe).

Nanabozho name variations
The Nanabozho name varies in the Ojibwe language depending on whether it is presented with a first-person prefix n- (i.e. Nanabozho), third-person prefix w- (i.e. Wanabozho), or null-person prefix m- (i.e. Manabozho); the "Manabozho" form of the name is most commonly associated with Menominee language version of these stories. In addition, depending on the story and the narrator's role in telling the story, the name may be presented in its regular nominative form (with the final o, i.e. Nanabozho) or in its vocative form (without the final o, i.e. Nanabozh). Due to the way the two o sounds, they are often each realized as oo (i.e. Nanaboozhoo). In some dialects, zh is realized as z. These variations allow for associating the name with the word for "rabbit(-)" (waabooz(o-)).

Due to the placement of word stress, determined by metrical rules that define a characteristic iambic metrical foot, in which a weak syllable is followed by a strong syllable, in some dialects the weak syllable may be reduced to a schwa, which may be recorded as either i or e (e.g. Winabozho or Wenabozho if the first weak syllable is graphically shown, Nanabizho if the second weak syllable is graphically shown).

In addition, though the Fiero double-vowel system uses zh, the same sound in other orthographies can be realized as j  in the Algonquin system or š (or sh) in the Saulteaux-Cree system (e.g. Nanabozho v. Nanabojo). To this mix, depending on if the transcriber used French or English, the Anishinaabe name may be transcribed to fit the phonetic patterns of one of the two said languages (e.g. "Winnaboujou" and "Nanabijou": French rendering of Winabozho and Nanabizho respectively, or "Nanabush": English rendering of Nanabozh).

Like the transcription variations found among "Nanabozho," often Mishaabooz is transcribed into French as Michabous and represented in English as Michabou. Additional name variations include "Winneboujou, Winabojo, Wenabozho, Wenaboozhoo, Waynaboozhoo, Wenebojo, Nanaboozhoo, Nanabojo, Nanabushu, Nanabush, Nanapush, Nenabush, Nenabozho, Nanabosho, Manabush, Manabozho, Manibozho, Nanahboozho, Minabozho, Manabus, Manibush, Manabozh, Manabozo, Manabozho, Manabusch, Manabush, Manabus, Menabosho, Nanaboojoo, Nanaboozhoo, Nanaboso, Nanabosho, Nenabuc, Amenapush, Ne-Naw-bo-zhoo, Kwi-wi-sens Nenaw-bo-zhoo [...] Michabo, Michabou, Michabous, Michaboo, Mishabo, Michabo, Misabos, Misabooz," and "Messou."

In popular culture 
Published in 1855, Henry Wadsworth Longfellow's epic poem, The Song of Hiawatha, is an outsider retelling of several Nanabozho stories. This claim is based on research conducted by Henry Rowe Schoolcraft.

Nanabozho is featured in the form of a trickster rabbit in Belgian comic series Yakari.

See also 
Aayaase
Naniboujou Club Lodge
Sleeping Giant (Ontario)
Winneboujou, Wisconsin

Notes

References
 Benton-Banai, Edward. The Mishomis Book: The Voice of the Ojibway. Hayward, WI: Indian Country Communications, 1988.
 Chamberlain, A. F. "Nanibozhu amongst the Otchipwe, Mississagas, and other Algonkian tribes," Journal of American Folklore 4 (1891): 193-213. https://doi.org/10.2307/534004.
 Johnston, Basil. Ojibway Heritage. Toronto: McClelland and Stewart, 1976.
 Barnouw, Victor. Wisconsin Chippewa Myths and Tales. Madison: University of Wisconsin Press, 1977.
 Webkamigad, Howard. Ottawa Stories from the Springs. East Lansing: Michigan State University Press, 2015.

External links
"Manabosho's Hieroglyphics" recorded by Seth Eastman at Northern Illinois University
"Nanabozo" in The Canadian Encyclopedia
"Nanabozho" in Handbook of American Indians North of Mexico, 1907. Reproduced in Handbook of Indians of Canada, 1913.
How Nanabush Created the World
Nanabush and the Giant Beaver
The Legend of 'Nanabozho' (from the CBC radio archives, as an audio file)
Native American: North Gods: Algonquin
Nanabozho, Access genealogy.

Anishinaabe mythology
Creator gods
Shapeshifting
Trickster gods